Combe is a surname. It is similar to the surname Coombes. Notable people with the surname include:

Alan Combe (born 1974), Scottish footballer
Andrew Combe (1797–1847), Scottish physiologist
Carmela Combe (1898–1984), Peruvian aviator
David Combe (1943–2019), Australian political figure and wine industry executive
George Combe (1788–1858), Scottish writer on phrenology and education
Harvey Christian Combe (1752–1818), English brewer and Lord Mayor of London
Ivan Combe (1911–2000), American inventor
John Frederick Boyce Combe (1895–1967), British Army officer before and during World War II
Martha Combe (1806–1893), British philanthropist
Peter Combe (born 1948), Australian musician
Reginaldus de Combe (fl. 1300–1301), English Member of Parliament
Rose Combe (1883–1932), French writer
Thomas Combe (1796–1872), British printer and philanthropist

See also 

 Combe (disambiguation)
 Coombes (surname)
 Lacombe (disambiguation)

Surnames
English toponymic surnames
English-language surnames
Surnames of English origin
Scottish surnames
Surnames of British Isles origin